Glenn Daniel Wilson (born 29 December 1942) is a psychologist best known for his work on attitude and personality measurement, sexual attraction, deviation and dysfunction, partner compatibility, and psychology applied to performing arts.

In 2001, Wilson was ranked among the 10 most frequently cited British psychologists in scientific journals. He is a fellow of the British Psychological Society and makes frequent media appearances as a psychology expert, especially in TV news and documentaries.

Biography
After graduating MA at the University of Canterbury, Christchurch, Wilson moved to London in 1967 to study for his PhD under the supervision of Hans Eysenck, with whom he subsequently collaborated on a number of research projects and co-authored six books. He also co-authored the Eysenck Personality Profiler, a standard personality test used in clinical research and industry. With John Patterson, he devised the Wilson–Patterson Conservatism Scale, which has been widely used as a measure of social attitudes. In 1973 he proposed the theory that a heritable trait reflecting fear of uncertainty underlies social attitudes across many fields. Together with G.Knyazev and H.Slobodskaya of the Russian Academy of Medical Sciences, Wilson has researched the EEG correlates of personality and produced a theory of the evolution of brain oscillations.

In a study conducted before leaving New Zealand, Wilson showed that classical fear conditioning in humans can be overridden by verbal reassurances of "safety". This initiated a continuing field of research concerned with the power of cognitive expectations to control anxiety that underlies the rationale of cognitive behavioral therapy.

Wilson was a pioneer in evolutionary approaches to understanding human sex differences and mating behavior  His 1975 study on the bust-waist ratio as an objective index of female sexual attractiveness presaged the waist–hip ratio, now used as an oestrogen (fertility) marker. His studies of sex fantasy yielded the Wilson Sex Fantasy Questionnaire.<ref>Wilson, G.D. (2010) Interpretation guidelines to Wilson's Sex Fantasy Questionnaire, Cymeon Pty</ref> With Peter Fenwick and others at the Institute of Psychiatry, he studied men with normal and paraphilic interests, and how they differed in their EEG responses to erotic images in certain brain areas.

Noting that men and women had different finger length patterns, Wilson introduced the 2D/4D digit ratio as a marker of exposure to prenatal testosterone in 1983.Wilson,G.D. (2010) Fingers to feminism: The rise of 2D:4D, Quarterly Review, 4, 25-32. His suggestion that autism might represent a hypermale brain was supported by much data, but others have argued is an unsatisfactory characterisation. Together with Jon Cousins wilson developed the compatibility quotient (CQ) in 2003, which was designed as a predictor of relationship success. With Qazi Rahman, Wilson has published research supporting the conclusion that sexual orientation is of constitutional origin.

Wilson is a part-time professional baritone singer, and has taught courses on Psychology of Performance. He wrote a textbook on the subject, Psychology for Performing Artists'' (Wiley, 2002) which is in its second edition. He is Founder/Treasurer of "Connaught Opera", a UK charity which provides free concerts to older people in care homes, day centres and heritage sites.

From 2009 to 2014 Wilson was Visiting Professor of Psychology at Gresham College, London. Prior to that (1994-2008), he was Reader in Personality at the Institute of Psychiatry, King's College, University of London. He has held visiting appointments at several American institutions, including California State University, Los Angeles, Stanford University, San Francisco State University, Sierra Nevada College and the University of Nevada, Reno, where he was Adjunct Professor for many years.

References

Selected works

External links
 Dr Glenn Wilson, homepage

Living people
1942 births
British psychologists
Commentators
Evolutionary psychologists
People from Christchurch
Stanford University staff
Sierra Nevada College
New Zealand expatriates in England
New Zealand scientists
New Zealand writers
University of Canterbury alumni
Fellows of the British Psychological Society